is a sub-kilometer asteroid, classified as a near-Earth object and a potentially hazardous asteroid of the  Apollo group, approximately 200 meters in diameter. It was first observed on 19 December 2012, by astronomers Andrey Oreshko and Timur Kryachko at the Elena Remote Observatory located in the Chilean Atacama desert.

Description 

With a 4-day observation arc, the asteroid had a 1 in 3 million chance of impacting in 2106. With a 10-day observation arc, the asteroid had a 1 in 10 million chance of impacting in 2106. On 5 January 2013, the asteroid passed  from Earth. It was removed from the Sentry Risk Table on 8 January 2013. It has an observation arc of 32 days and an orbital uncertainty of 7. Since the asteroid has a poorly known orbit, the cone of uncertainty quickly multiplies as a result of perturbations by the inner planets and prevents precise/reliable ephemeris data. Eliminating an entry on the Sentry Risk Table is a negative prediction; a prediction of where it will NOT be.

In the popular press 

In 2013, an article, originally posted on The Voice of Russia had a poorly researched headline stating "We have 93 years left till the next End of the World". This story was reposted on Space Daily, but then astronomer Phil Plait clarified that it was "a fascinating mix of fact and error. A lot of what it says is accurate, but the most important claim—that an asteroid will impact Earth in 2106—is simply wrong."

See also
 Torino Scale
 Palermo scale

References

External links 
 
 
 

Minor planet object articles (unnumbered)

20121219